Mordellistenula is a genus of beetles in the family Mordellidae, containing the following species:

 Mordellistenula anomala Ermisch, 1957
 Mordellistenula lacinicollis Csetó, 1990
 Mordellistenula longipalpis Ermisch, 1965
 Mordellistenula perrisi (Mulsant, 1857)
 Mordellistenula plutonica Compte, 1970

References

Mordellidae